Douglas Hutchinson (1918 – December 1995) was a Northern Ireland Unionist politician

Born in Richhill, County Armagh, Hutchinson worked as a fruit farmer.  In 1953, he succeeded his father as an Ulster Unionist Party (UUP) member of Armagh Rural District Council, holding his seat until its abolition in 1973. He was also active in Ian Paisley's Ulster Protestant Action, and was prominent in the paramilitary Ulster Protestant Volunteers.  He served in the Ulster Special Constabulary, but left after being sentenced to one month's imprisonment for disrupting a civil rights march in Armagh in November 1968.

Hutchinson resigned from the UUP in October 1969, stating that he disagreed with their policy of compromise.  Around this time, he was expelled from the Orange Order and from the Royal Black Preceptory for protesting against what he saw as support for appeasement among some of their leadership.  In 1971, he was sentenced to six months in prison for taking part in a banned parade in Dungiven although, on appeal, this was commuted to a £60 fine.

Hutchinson stood for the Democratic Unionist Party in Armagh at the 1973 Northern Ireland Assembly election, becoming the last candidate elected. He was elected to Armagh District Council at the 1973 local election. He was elected to the 1975 Northern Ireland Constitutional Convention with an increased vote, but failed to take a seat in the 1982 Assembly election. He held his council seat until his retirement in 1993, when he was succeeded by his son, Brian.

References

1918 births
1995 deaths
Members of Armagh City and District Council
Democratic Unionist Party politicians
Farmers from Northern Ireland
Members of the Northern Ireland Assembly 1973–1974
Members of the Northern Ireland Constitutional Convention
People from County Armagh
Ulster Unionist Party councillors
Loyalists imprisoned during the Northern Ireland conflict
Ulster Protestant Volunteers members